The Purcell's ghost frog (Heleophryne purcelli) is a species of frog in the family Heleophrynidae.
It is endemic to Western Cape Province, South Africa.
Its natural habitat is fynbos heathland. Breeding takes place in perennial streams. Their tadpoles take two years to develop fully.

Purcell's ghost frog is a common species that is not significantly threatened, but is locally affected by introduced species.

References

Heleophryne
Endemic amphibians of South Africa
Taxa named by William Lutley Sclater
Amphibians described in 1898
Taxonomy articles created by Polbot